was a Japanese biochemist and oncologist known for demonstrating the induction of liver cancer in rats by Ortho-Aminoazotoluene with his pupil Tomizo Yoshida. In addition, he was also known as a master of fencing in Japan. He received the Imperial Prize of the Japan Academy twice (1924 and 1936).

He was nominated for the Nobel Prize in Physiology or Medicine in 14 nominations.

Life
Takaoki Sasaki who was Masakichi Sasaki's son-in-law graduated from the Medical College, Tokyo Imperial University and went to study Biochemistry, Bacteriology, and Serum therapy in Germany for five years. On returning to Japan, he was appointed as Professor of Internal Medicine, Kyoto Imperial University in 1913, before becoming Director of the Kyoundo Hospital in Tokyo in 1916. In addition, he became Director at the Cancer Institute, Japanese Foundation for Cancer Research in 1935.

In 1939 Sasaki donated his private research institute, together with some of his private property, and applied to the Japanese Government to establish a new medical foundation. This was approved by the Ministry of Education in January 1939 as a non profit research foundation, and then the Sasaki Foundation and its attached medical institute (the Sasaki Institute today) were established.

Recognition
Sasaki received numerous honors and awards include the following:
 1924 Imperial Prize of the Japan Academy
 1936 Imperial Prize of the Japan Academy
 1940 Order of Culture
 1951 Person of Cultural Merit

References

External links
Sasaki Institute

Japanese oncologists
Japanese biochemists
Cancer researchers
1878 births
1966 deaths
Laureates of the Imperial Prize
Recipients of the Order of Culture
Academic staff of Kyoto University
University of Tokyo alumni